Carla Giuliano (born 2 April 1983) is an Italian politician. She was elected as a member of the Five Star Movement and has sat in the Chamber of Deputies since 2018.

Biography 
She was born in San Severo.

See also 

 List of members of the Italian Chamber of Deputies, 2018–

References 

Living people
1983 births
Deputies of Legislature XVIII of Italy
21st-century Italian women politicians
Five Star Movement politicians
People from Apulia
Women members of the Chamber of Deputies (Italy)